The 1904 Wellington City mayoral election was part of the New Zealand local elections held that same year. The polling was conducted using the standard first-past-the-post electoral method.

Background
In 1904 John Aitken, the incumbent Mayor, was re-elected to office as Mayor of Wellington, beating challenges from both Thomas Wilford and Thomas William Hislop.

Mayoralty results
The following table gives the election results:

Notes

References

Mayoral elections in Wellington
1904 elections in New Zealand
Politics of the Wellington Region
1900s in Wellington